Heruz-e Sofla (also Romanized as Herūz-e Soflá and Harūz-e Soflá, Herūz, Herūz-e Pā’īn, and Harūz-e Pā’īn) is a village in Heruz Rural District, Kuhsaran District, Ravar County, Kerman Province, Iran. At the 2006 census, its population was 176, in 50 families.

References 

Populated places in Ravar County